Franciszek Jan Bronikowski (25 February 1907 – 1 December 1964) was a Polish rower who competed in the 1928 Summer Olympics.

In 1928 he won the bronze medal as member of the Polish boat in the coxed four event.

He was born in Bromberg, Province of Posen and died in Milanówek. Adam Bronikowski is his grandson.

References

External links
 profile 

1907 births
1964 deaths
Polish male rowers
Olympic rowers of Poland
Rowers at the 1928 Summer Olympics
Olympic bronze medalists for Poland
Olympic medalists in rowing
Sportspeople from Bydgoszcz
Medalists at the 1928 Summer Olympics
European Rowing Championships medalists